Frederick "Fred" Burlew (March 20, 1871 – May 3, 1927) was an American Thoroughbred racehorse trainer. He was the trainer of the winning horse of the Kentucky Derby in 1922. He was inducted into the National Museum of Racing and Hall of Fame in 1973.

References

1871 births
1927 deaths
American horse trainers
United States Thoroughbred Racing Hall of Fame inductees
Sportspeople from Cincinnati